Orchipedum is a genus of flowering plants from the orchid family, Orchidaceae. It contains three known species, all native to Southeast Asia.

 Orchipedum echinatum Aver. & Averyanova - Vietnam
 Orchipedum plantaginifolium Breda - Thailand, Java, Peninsular Malaysia 
 Orchipedum wenzelii (Ames) J.J.Sm. - Philippines

See also 
 List of Orchidaceae genera

References 

 Berg Pana, H. 2005. Handbuch der Orchideen-Namen. Dictionary of Orchid Names. Dizionario dei nomi delle orchidee. Ulmer, Stuttgart

External links 

Cranichideae genera
Goodyerinae
Orchids of Asia